Penguin Essentials (also called Essential Penguins) refers to two series of books published by Penguin Books in the UK. The first series began in 1998, and the second in 2011. For both series, the classic books were released in smaller A-format size; the covers were redesigned by contemporary artists to appeal to a new generation of readers. Many titles appeared in both series.

2011 series

See also
 Penguin Red Classics
 Pocket Penguins
 Great Books of the 20th Century
 Ten of the Best
 Penguin European Writers
 Green Ideas

References

External links
 Official web site
 

Lists of novels
Penguin Books book series